The horned marsupial frog (Gastrotheca cornuta), originally named Nototrema cornutum (Boulenger) after the first describer George Albert Boulenger in 1898), is a species of frog in the family Hemiphractidae. It is an arboreal species found in Colombia, Costa Rica, Ecuador and Panama. Its natural habitats are tropical moist lowland forests and montane cloud forests. It is threatened by habitat loss.

Description
The head is broad and the snout is rounded when viewed from above. The iris of the eye is bronze with a greenish center and the upper eyelid has a triangular peak. The skin on the back is smooth and has a number of transverse ridges. The fingers are unwebbed but have circular pads on their tips. The hind legs are long and the toes are partially webbed. The female has a pouch on her lower back in which she broods her eggs. The body color is pale brown at night but dark brown by day and there are pale markings between the mouth and eyes during the day. Permanent color features include narrow dark transverse stripes on the body, a dark line running from near the eye to the groin and a pinkish or light brown belly.

Distribution
It lives high in the forest canopy.

Life cycle
The male Gastrotheca cornuta calls from high in the canopy to attract a mate. His call sounds like a champagne cork being drawn. The eggs of Gastrotheca cornuta are the largest known amphibian eggs. They are carried in individual chambers in the female's brood pouch. The developing embryos have umbrella-like external gills that spread out against the pouch wall, which is highly vascular. Gas exchange takes place through the wall of the pouch. There is no free-living tadpole stage for this species and when their development is complete, tiny froglets make their way out of the brood pouch.

Status
Gastrotheca cornuta is listed as "Endangered" in the IUCN Red List of Threatened Species. Numbers of individuals across its range have been decreasing and it is no longer present in Costa Rica and Panama on the Atlantic slope. It has also decreased in numbers in Colombia and in Ecuador where it never was common. Its status in eastern Panama is unknown. The reasons for its decline include the disease chytridiomycosis, deforestation, and human activities.

References

Gastrotheca
Frogs of North America
Frogs of South America
Amphibians of Colombia
Amphibians of Costa Rica
Amphibians of Ecuador
Amphibians of Panama
Endangered fauna of North America
Endangered fauna of South America
Taxonomy articles created by Polbot
Amphibians described in 1898